Andrew Marc Shelton (born 19 June 1980) is an English footballer who played in the Football League for Chester City. He is the son of former Sheffield Wednesday midfielder Gary Shelton, who was assistant manager at Chester when Andy was part of the first-team squad from 1998 to 2000.

Shelton made his Chester debut on 18 April 1998 as a substitute during a 3–1 win over Colchester United. He went on to make 48 first-team appearances for the club before moving on to Harrogate Town in December 2000. He went on to play for Ossett Albion, Caernarfon Town, Hyde United and Ossett Town before joining Chester-based Christleton of the West Cheshire Amateur Football League. He was still playing there at the midway stage of the 2007–08 season.

External links

Welsh Premier career details
Chester City 'What Happened To...?' feature (2002)
Chester City 'What Happened To...?' feature (2004)
Hyde United career stats

References

1980 births
Living people
Sportspeople from Sutton Coldfield
English footballers
Association football midfielders
Chester City F.C. players
Harrogate Town A.F.C. players
Ossett Albion A.F.C. players
Caernarfon Town F.C. players
Hyde United F.C. players
Ossett Town F.C. players
Christleton F.C. players
English Football League players
Cymru Premier players
National League (English football) players